Klimeschia afghanica is a moth in the family Douglasiidae. It was described by Reinhard Gaedike in 1974. It is found in Afghanistan, Iran and Tuva, Russia.

References

Moths described in 1974
Douglasiidae